The International Financial Congress (IFC) is a major annual conference dedicated to the finance industry. The event brings together heads of central and commercial banks, financial institutions, international financial organizations and financial regulatory authorities, as well as renowned experts from around the world and figures from academia and business. Since 1992, it has been held in St. Petersburg. 
Before 2016, the event was called the International Banking Congress (IBC).
Congress sessions are held in the form of interactive discussions, in which the most topical issues arising in the global banking and financial system are discussed.

History 
In the autumn of 1991, the first International Banking Congress was held in Frankfurt am Main, which was attended by Anatoly Sobchak, the then Mayor of St. Petersburg, and Viktor Khalansky, who was in charge of the Main St. Petersburg Office of the Central Bank of Russia. In his speech, Sobchak suggested that the next Congress be held in St. Petersburg.

An initiative was put forward by the Central Bank of Russia, and subsequently approved by the Russian government, to approach the world's leading banking institutions with the proposal to hold the International Banking Congress in St. Petersburg.

The proposal gained support from representatives of leading banks, international banking and financial institutions, and audit firms.

On January 16, 1992, a non-governmental organization, named the Foundation for Support of the International Banking Congress, was established to facilitate the running of the congress. The organization was renamed the St. Petersburg Public Foundation for the Support of the International Banking Congress in 1998.

In April 1992, the first St. Petersburg-based International Banking Congress was held. The Congress was attended by over 350 participants from 50 countries. The Vice-Mayor of St. Petersburg was a member of the organizing committee for the first five International Banking Congress events. At present, the President of the Russian Federation Vladimir Putin is a member of the committee.

IFC timeline

External links 
  International Financial Congress.
  International Banking Congress.
  Roscongress Foundation.
  The Central Bank of the Russian Federation.

References 

International finance
International conferences in Russia